Orsugissap Qaqqarsua (old spelling: Orssugissap Qaqqarssua) is a nunatak of the Greenland ice sheet in Avannaata municipality in northwestern Greenland.

Geography 
Orsugissap Qaqqarsua is located on the mainland of Greenland in the northern part of Upernavik Archipelago. Due to the glacial retreat, it is now conjoint in the north with Anoritooq, a  nunatak. To the west and south, the nunatak is surrounded by the waters of Sugar Loaf Bay, and its innermost inlets, the largest of which is Niaqornarsuup Iterlaa in the south.

References 

Nunataks of Greenland
Sugar Loaf Bay
Upernavik Archipelago